Kaashidhoo as a place name may refer to:
 Kaashidhoo (Gaafu Dhaalu Atoll) (Republic of Maldives)
 Kaashidhoo (Kaafu Atoll) (Republic of Maldives)